Vennikulam is a small town situated in the bank of Manimala River Near Thiruvalla in Pathanamthitta district of Kerala, South India. Town is located midway between Pullad and Mallapally towns. It Is Part Of Thiruvalla Constituency.

Vennikulam town is situated about 12km from Thiruvalla, Nearest Railway Station is Tiruvalla and Nearest Airport is Cochin International Airport. Sabarimala, a popular pilgrimage destination in South India, is only 75 km away from Vennikulam. State Highway 9 (Kerala) also known as Kottayam - Kozhencherry State Highway passes through Vennikulam.The major bus routes passing through Vennikulam junction are the "Thiruvalla to Ranni" and "Kottayam to Kozhencherry" bus routes. Private and KSRTC buses also ply the route.

Notable Persons 
 Vennikkulam Gopala Kurup (1902 – 1980) - Malayalam poet

Educational Institutions Near Vennikulam 
 Mahakavi Vennikulam Gopala Kurup Memorial Government Polytechnic College, Vennikulam, offering technical diploma courses in Civil, Electrical, Computer and Automobile Engineering
 St. Behanan's Higher Secondary School, Vennikulam
 St. Behanans L.P School, Thelliyoor P.O, Vennikulam
 Mar Dionysius Lower Primary School (M. D. L. P. School), Vennikulam 
 Mar Dionysius Upper Primary School (M. D. U. P. School), Vellaramemala, Vennikulam 
 St Thomas English Medium UP School , Vennikulam
 Mar Theophilos Bethany Convent Public School, Vennikulam
Bethany Educational Society - Vennikulam

Places of worship and religious institutions  
 Thelliyoor kavu Devi Temple, Thelliyoor
 St. Behanans Orthodox Church, Vennikulam 
 Salem Marthoma Church, Vennikulam
 Ebenezer Mar Thoma Church, Valankara, Vennikulam
 St. Mary's Orthodox Church, Vennikulam
 St Thomas Malankara Catholic Church, Vennikulam
 St. John's Orthodox Church, Vennikulam Bethany
 St. George Orthodox Church, Vennikulam Muthupala
 Paduthodu Sree Ayyappa temple, Paduthodu, Vennikulam
 Sree Poritturkkavu Devi Temple, Ambattubhagom, Vennikulam
 Thelliyoor Salem Marthoma Church, Valakuzhy
 St. Thomas Marthoma Church, Thuruthicad
 IPC Ebenezer, Memala, Vennikulam
 Vennikulam Mar Baselious orthodox church
 Thalachirayil Devi Temple, Vennikulam
Muhiyideen juma musjid, Paduthodu, Vennikulam

References 

Cities and towns in Pathanamthitta district